Plagiobasis is a genus of Asian plants in the tribe Cardueae within the family Asteraceae.

Species
The only known species is Plagiobasis centuroides, native to Kazakhstan, Kyrgyzstan, Xinjiang, and Altai Krai.

formerly included
see Russowia 
Plagiobasis sogdiana Bunge - Russowia sogdiana (Bunge) B.Fedtsch.

References

Flora of Asia
Monotypic Asteraceae genera
Cynareae
Taxa named by Alexander von Schrenk